The White River Valley is a region in central Vermont, United States. The area is a natural river valley of the White River. 

As defined by the valley's chamber of commerce, it includes eleven towns: Bethel, Braintree, Brookfield, Chelsea, Hancock, Randolph, Rochester, Royalton, Sharon, Stockbridge, and Tunbridge.

The White River Valley Consortium works to address regional issues in the area, among fourteen towns, also including Granville, Pittsfield, and Strafford.

The Herald, also known as the White River Valley Herald and The Herald of Randolph, has served sixteen towns in the White River Valley since 1874.

The area was once heavily farmed, though reforestation efforts by the Civilian Conservation Corps were especially evident in the region.

See also
 White River Valley Railroad

Further reading
 , with accompanying photographs.

References

Regions of Vermont
River valleys of the United States
Valleys of Vermont
Landforms of Windsor County, Vermont
Landforms of Orange County, Vermont
Landforms of Addison County, Vermont